Lightning on the Strings, Thunder on the Mic is an album by New York City based bluegrass rap group Gangstagrass, released in 2010.  It features rapper T.O.N.E-z on vocals.

Track listing

Musicians
Rench – vocals, guitar, beats
T.O.N.E-z – raps
Matt Check – banjo, vocals
Todd Livingston – resonator guitar
Jason Cade – fiddle
Roy Shimmyo – bass guitar
PREPMODE – turntables
Jen Larson – vocals

References 

https://web.archive.org/web/20110704135847/http://www.renchaudio.com/releases/lightning-on-the-strings-thunder-on-the-mic

External links 
Gangstagrass official homepage
Official album page

Gangstagrass albums
2010 albums